"Your Love Amazes Me" is a song written by Amanda Hunt-Taylor and Chuck Jones, and recorded by American country music singer John Berry.  It was released in January 1994 as the third single from the album John Berry.  It is his only Number One single on the Hot Country Singles & Tracks (now Hot Country Songs) chart.  It was also the first of two Number Ones for him on the RPM Country Tracks charts. A cover version was released in 1996 by Contemporary Christian singer Michael English. Andy Childs also recorded it on his 1993 self-titled album and released it as the B-side to his 1993 single "Broken."

Critical reception
Larry Flick, of Billboard magazine reviewed the song favorably, saying that it is "a nice showcase for Berry's unique, country/soul voice." He goes on to call it a "heartfelt performance."

Music video
The music video was directed by John Lloyd Miller and premiered in early 1994.

Chart positions

John Berry
"Your Love Amazes Me" debuted at number 67 on the U.S. Billboard Hot Country Singles & Tracks for the week of February 12, 1994.

Year-end charts

Michael English

References

1993 songs
1994 singles
1996 singles
John Berry (country singer) songs
Michael English (singer) songs
Songs written by Chuck Jones (songwriter)
Liberty Records singles
Music videos directed by John Lloyd Miller